B. F. Brisac (September 15, 1858 – January 6, 1940) was an American business executive and humanitarian known for his work with the San Francisco Society for the Prevention of Cruelty to Animals and other humane organizations in the early 1900s.

Early life and career
Brisac was born Belnore Felix Brisac in San Francisco, CA in 1858, the son of Felix and Virginia (Grain) Brisac. His father was a French expatriate in the line of the Dukes of Brissac.  His mother was the daughter of French-American painter and scenographer Fredrick Grain.  He had two brothers, Camille (1851–1855) and Norline (1856–1903).

Known professionally as B. F. Brisac, Belnore began his career working for Murphy Grant & Company (importers and jobbers of dry goods) in San Francisco in 1877. When his father died in 1882, he went to work as an insurance soliciter with The Liverpool & London & Globe Insurance Company (LLG), filling the position his father had held there. He later became a broker and continued his affiliation with LLG for the next thirty years.

Brisac also invested time and money in Bay area development ventures. A proponent of the modern Olympic Movement, he joined and later became a Director of the Olympic Club. He owned stock in the Olympic Salt Water Company (1894) and was vice president and general manager of the Boulder Creek Electric Light and Water Company which he helped found in 1903.

Work on insurance reforms

Following the San Francisco earthquake and fire in 1906, many wealthy families abandoned the city, some never to return; Brisac chose to stay. Working from the basement of their damaged office building, he and others at LLG began processing insurance claims within days of the fire being put out. The Mayor of San Francisco had declared martial law and issued a shoot-to-kill order for looters. To speed the payouts that would allow families to keep their property, Brisac secured a pass from the Mayor and for weeks traversed San Francisco with a money belt and a pistol for self-protection while paying off claims.

The massive earthquake damage, and the rampant fraud following the fire combined to force many insurance companies to go bankrupt or abandon policy holders, but Liverpool & London & Globe survived and Brisac became an advocate for insurance reforms, working as a member and later Chairman of the Board of Governors of the Insurance Broker's Exchange of San Francisco.

Brisac was involved in San Francisco's reconstruction efforts for over a decade. In 1914, he chaired the Insurance Broker's Committee of the World's Insurance Congress, and invested in the 1914 Panama–Pacific International Exposition, and he continued to contribute to disaster relief efforts such as the 1918 San Jacinto Earthquake Fund.

Along with other survivors, Brisac struggled to come to terms with the death and destruction caused by the earthquake, and he found consolation in the teachings of the new Christian Science. In 1908, he introduced Christian Science lecturer F. H. Leonard to a crowd of 4000 in the Dreamland Rink auditorium in San Francisco. Acknowledging the large turnout, Brisac proposed that the question on everyone's mind was “What is there in it?” and suggested that it offered what humanity was missing – “...reconciliation with god.” In 1913, he was elected First Reader in the newly built San Francisco First Church of Christ, Scientist.

Work with humane organizations
Brisac grew up in the waning days of the California Gold Rush and witnessed the routine abuse of dray horses and mules on San Francisco streets, and he had known about the work of the Society for the Prevention of Cruelty to Animals since its founding in 1868. But his involvement with the group didn't begin until the aftermath of the earthquake in 1906, where he assisted in the rescue of trapped and injured animals and helped build water troughs for the horses used in rescue and reconstruction. He joined the Society in 1907 and was active for the rest of his life, as a member (1907–1916), Trustee (1916–1930), and President (1930–1940). At the time of his death, he was also First Vice-President, formerly President of the State Humane Association of California and Director of the American Humane Association active in American Red Star Rescue and Animal Relief.

Family life and later years

Brisac married Alice M. Hain in 1878 and they had two children - Virginia, born in 1883, and Belnore Brisac, Jr. born in 1888.

When Virginia was nineteen, Brisac and his wife were persuaded by friend and local theatre impresario Reginald Travers to allow her to act professionally.  She quickly became a headliner on the West Coast Stock theatre circuit and, in April 1906, married an actor she met while on tour in Los Angeles, California. When the marriage failed in 1911, Brisac made a home for Virginia's four-year-old daughter, Ardel, who lived with them for over ten years before finally rejoining her mother in 1922. Brisac continued to be a surrogate father and mentor to his granddaughter until his death in 1940.

Alice Brisac died in 1924 after a long illness. B. F. remarried in 1930, and he and his second wife continued living in San Francisco until his death ten years later.

Death and tribute

Upon his death on January 6, 1940, the Board of Trustees of The San Francisco Society for the Prevention of Cruelty to Animals paid tribute to Brisac in a resolution which read in part: “His was a long, full and beneficent life. Kindness for his fellow men and a deep sense of consideration and responsibility for the welfare of helpless creatures were primary precepts upon which he based his conduct and living. As a humanitarian, his loss will be felt throughout the entire country.”

His ashes were interred in the Brisac family niche, along with those of his wife and others in his family, in the Columbarium at the Mt. Olivet Memorial Park in Colma, California outside of San Francisco.

Notes

References

People from San Francisco
1858 births
1940 deaths
Businesspeople from the San Francisco Bay Area
Animal welfare and rights in the United States